Myrna Lee Gopnik (born 1935) is a Canadian linguist. She is a professor emerita of linguistics at McGill University.  She is known for her research on the KE family, an English family with several members affected by specific language impairment.

Gopnik is generally credited with an important early evaluation of the KE family, and with making this family known to the wider scientific community.  Subsequent research by Anthony Monaco, Simon Fisher and colleagues at Oxford University identified a mutation in the FOXP2 gene as a cause of the KE family's disorder (see: A forkhead-domain gene is mutated in a severe speech and language disorder.

Gopnik's son Adam is a well-known novelist and writer for the New Yorker, her son Blake has a doctorate from University of Oxford and is an art critic, and her daughter Alison is a developmental psychology professor at UC-Berkeley.

Publications
 Linguistic structures in scientific texts, 1968
 Semiotic approaches to theories, 1976
 The inheritance and innateness of grammars, 1997

References

1935 births
Living people
Jewish Canadian scientists
Linguists from Canada
Canadian psychologists
Canadian women psychologists
Academic staff of McGill University
Place of birth missing (living people)
Women linguists